Gergő Vaszicsku (born 30 June 1991) is a Hungarian professional footballer who plays for Budafoki MTE.

Club statistics

Updated to games played as of 15 May 2021.

References
MLSZ 
HLSZ 

1991 births
Living people
Sportspeople from Debrecen
Hungarian footballers
Association football defenders
Jászberényi SE footballers
FC Felcsút players
Fehérvár FC players
Puskás Akadémia FC players
Csákvári TK players
Budafoki LC footballers
Nemzeti Bajnokság I players
Nemzeti Bajnokság II players